Clitoria fairchildiana, the sombreiro, is a flowering plant species in the genus Clitoria found in Campina Grande, Brazil.

The rotenoids clitoriacetal, stemonacetal, 6-deoxyclitoriacetal, 11-deoxyclitoriacetal, 9-demethylclitoriacetal and  can be isolated from C. fairchildiana.

References

External links

fairchildiana
Plants described in 1967